Rhodia (minor planet designation: 437 Rhodia) is a Main belt asteroid that was discovered by French astronomer Auguste Charlois on 16 July 1898 in Nice. It was named after one of the Oceanid nymphs of Greek mythology. The orbital plane is tilted at an angle of 7.3° to the plane of the ecliptic. 437 Rhodia was originally a proposed fly-by target of interest for the Rosetta mission.

References

External links 
 
 

Background asteroids
Rhodia
Rhodia
Slow rotating minor planets
18980716